Deadly Illusion is a 1987 action/crime thriller film directed by Larry Cohen and William Tannen. It stars Billy Dee Williams,  Vanity, and Morgan Fairchild.

Plot
Hamberger is a freelance private eye without a license and without a car, who hangs out at delis looking for potential work. He is approached by a businessman claiming to be Alex Burton who offers him $100,000 to kill his wife Sharon who knows too much about his business dealings. Hamberger accepts a down payment of $25,000 but instead decides to inform Sharon of the plot and helps her flee by plane. Nevertheless Mrs. Burton is soon found shot dead in the house with Hamberger's fingerprints all around the crime scene.

After escaping from Detective Lefferts at his apartment Hamberger confronts the businessman at a party. The man attacks him with a scythe and Hamberger throws him out a window. The party guests inform Hamberger that the man was not Mr. Burton at all so Hamberger returns to his apartment where he explains the situation to Detective Lefferts and is taken to view the body of Sharon Burton, who is not the woman he met either. Hamberger uncovers a heroin distribution operation through a link to a modeling agency and seeks to find the real killer before the police take him in for a crime he did not commit. The film ends in a final armed showdown at Shea Stadium.

Cast
 Billy Dee Williams as a Hamberger
 Vanity as Rina
 Morgan Fairchild as Jane Mallory / Sharon Burton
 John Beck as Alex Burton
 Dennis Hallahan as Alex Burton Impostor
 Joseph Cortese as Detective Paul Lefferts
 Joe Spinell as Hitman (as Joe Spinnel)

Production
Filming took place at Rockefeller Center, Times Square in Manhattan and at Shea Stadium in Queens.

Release
Deadly Illusion premiered in the United States on October 16, 1987, and in the Philippines on July 6, 1988.

References

External links

1987 films
1987 action films
1980s crime thriller films
American crime thriller films
American detective films
CineTel Films films
Films about the illegal drug trade
Films directed by Larry Cohen
Films set in New York City
Films shot in New York City
Films with screenplays by Larry Cohen
1980s English-language films
1980s American films